The Museum of Croatian Archaeological Monuments located at Meštrovićevo šetalište 18, Split, Croatia, is the only museum in the country dedicated to researching and presenting cultural artifacts of the Croats in the Middle Ages, between the 7th and 15th centuries, particularly the time of the early medieval Croatian state from 9th to 12th century.

The museum was founded in Knin in 1893, and was moved first to Sinj, then Klis and finally to Split where today the collection is displayed in a purpose-built museum complex, opened in 1976.

The holdings consist mainly of jewellery, weapons and items of daily use, and include many stone artifacts that once belonged to the old Croatian church interiors. The collection of early medieval wicker, clay figurines, and old Croatian Latin epigraphic monuments is the largest collection of its kind in Europe.

References

External links 
 

Museums established in 1893
Archaeological museums in Croatia
Museums in Split, Croatia